Konstantine "Koko" Gamsakhurdia (born June 24, 1961) is a Georgian politician and an Iranist. He is the leader of the Tavisupleba ("Freedom") political party.

Biography 
Konstantine Gamsakhurdia is the only son from the first marriage of Zviad Gamsakhurdia and grew up in Tbilisi. He is a namesake of his paternal grandfather, Konstantine Gamsakhurdia, the leading 20th-century Georgian novelist. After the 1991-92 coup d'état against his father and the legitimate government he fled with his family to Switzerland. He lived in Dornach and worked as a translator and as a freelancer for several newspapers. 

In 2004 Gamsakhurdia returned to Georgia for the first time in twelve years and began his work as a politician. He has been part of the opposition to Mikheil Saakashvili's government since then and founded the Tavisupleba ("Freedom") party. He was elected to the Parliament of Georgia on May 21, 2008 parliamentary elections, but refused, together with several opposition politicians, to take the seat, claiming that the polls were rigged. He was allowed to regain the seat and joined the Parliament in November 2009, becoming a chair of the parliamentary commission investigating the death of the late President Zviad Gamsakhurdia.      

Gamsakhurdia is married and has two sons.

Publications (selection) 
 Zviad Gamsakhurdia. Dissident - Präsident - Märtyrer, Basel 1995, Perseus-Verlag, 

Contributions
 Beiträge zur Geschichte der Humboldt-Universität zu Berlin, Part 2, Edeltraud Krüger, Berlin (East) 1982

References

External links 
 Sprießendes Laub, das nervös macht, Konstantine Gamsakhurdia 
 Synopsis of Gamsakhurdia's book about his father Zviad Gamsakhurdia 

1961 births
Living people
Tavisupleba (political party) politicians